HMS Wallaroo was a  built for the Royal Navy, originally named HMS Persian, built by Armstrong Whitworth, Elswick, Tyne and Wear and launched on 5 February 1890.

Renamed on 2 April 1890, as Wallaroo as part of the Auxiliary Squadron of the Australia Station. She arrived in Sydney with the squadron on 5 September 1891. She was placed into reserve upon arrival until 9 May 1894. She was sent to serve in China during the Boxer Rebellion in 1900. On 6 January 1904 while sailing off Montague Island, one of her boilers exploded killing four and wounding three. She left the Australia Station on 11 January 1906.

She became a guard ship at Chatham in November 1914.
She was then stationed off Brightlingsea, Essex, as the base ship for the boom and net-protected Swin Anchorage, returning to Chatham in 1916. Her captains between late 1914 and 1916 included Commanders Calderon, Ingham, and West, with Rear-Admiral Charles Napier as overall commander of the Brightlingsea naval base also named "Wallaroo". The ship was often overflown by raiding Zeppelins and once fired on one. She was renamed HMS Wallington in March 1919. She was sold in 1920, as Wallaroo to G. Sharpe for breaking up.

Notes

References

Gardiner, Robert, ed. Conway's All the World's Fighting Ships 1906–1921. Annapolis, Maryland: Naval Institute Press, 1985. .

 

1890 ships
Ships built by Armstrong Whitworth
Ships built on the River Tyne
Pearl-class cruisers
Victorian-era cruisers of the United Kingdom